Cleveland Mitchell was a Jamaican-born, British actor. He portrayed the character of Michael Power in a marketing campaign of the same name by Guinness. He also starred in Critical Assignment in 2004. He died on April 15, 2010.

Filmography

References 

2010 deaths
British male film actors
Jamaican male film actors